Lian may refer to:

Fiction
Gao Lian (Water Margin), a character in the Water Margin series of novels  
Lian the Great (Dalian), a figure in Chinese mythology
Jia Lian, a character in the novel Dream of the Red Chamber

People
Lian (given name), a list of people with this given name
Lian (surname) (連 and 廉), Chinese surname

Places
Lian, Batangas, a municipality in the province of Batangas in the Philippines
Lian, Iran, a village in Isfahan Province, Iran
Lian, Norway, a recreational area located in the border between Bymarka and Byåsen in Trondheim, Norway
Lian (station), the terminus of Gråkallbanen
Lian Island, the largest island in Lianyungang, Jiangsu, China

Other
Lian Ensemble, a Persian classical music ensemble

See also
Chuu-Lian, a Taiwanese-American mathematician
Kim-Lian (born 1980), Dutch musical actress, presenter and a singer-songwriter